The 2007–08 Mount St. Mary's Mountaineers men's basketball team represented Mount St. Mary's University during the 2007–08 NCAA Division I men's basketball season. The Mountaineers, led by head coach Milan Brown, played their home games at Knott Arena and were members of the Northeast Conference. They finished the season 19–15, 11–7 in NEC play to finish in a tie for fourth place. They were champions of the NEC tournament to earn an automatic bid to the NCAA tournament. After defeating Coppin State in the Play-in Game, the Mountaineers lost to No. 1 seed North Carolina in the Round of 64.

Roster

Schedule and results

|-
!colspan=9 style=| Regular season

|-
!colspan=9 style=| Northeast Conference tournament

|-
!colspan=9 style=| NCAA tournament

References

Mount St. Mary's Mountaineers men's basketball seasons
Mount St. Mary's
Mount St. Mary's
Mount
Mount